Lesbian, gay, bisexual, and transgender (LGBT) rights in Slovenia have significantly evolved over time. Slovenia is the first and currently the only post-communist and Slavic country to legalise same-sex marriage.

LGBT history in Slovenia 

Under the Penal Code of 30 June 1959, male homosexual acts were illegal in all of (now former) Yugoslavia. During the first half of the 1970s the power over penal legislation was devolved from the Federal Republic to the eight states and provinces. A new penal code that decriminalised homosexual intercourse was passed in 1976, and came into force in 1977. All discriminatory provisions were removed. There were no references to lesbian relationships in the old legislation.

Legality of same-sex sexual activity
Same-sex sexual activity has been legal since 1977, and age of consent is 15 years regardless of gender and sexual orientation.

Recognition of same-sex relationships

Registered partnership for same-sex couples has been legal since 23 July 2006, with limited inheritance, social security and next-of-kin rights.

In July 2009, the Constitutional Court held that Article 22 of the Registration of Same Sex Partnerships Act (RSSPA) violated the right to non-discrimination under Article 14 of the Constitution on the ground of sexual orientation, and required that the legislature remedy the established inconsistency within six months.

On 3 March 2015, the Assembly passed the bill to legalize same-sex marriage in a 51–28 vote. On 10 March 2015, the National Council rejected a motion to require the Assembly to vote on the bill again, in a 14–23 vote. Opponents of the bill launched a petition for a referendum. The petitioners have gained more than enough signatures for a referendum. On 22 October 2015, in a 5–4 vote, the Constitutional Court ruled the National Assembly could not interpret the constitution and that the vote to block the referendum was illegal. Slovenian Catholic groups, and Pope Francis urged people to vote against the same-sex marriage bill. The referendum took place on 20 December 2015 and the bill was rejected.

On 21 April 2016, the Assembly approved the bill to give same-sex partnerships all rights of marriage, except joint adoption and in vitro fertilisation. A petition for a referendum was launched, but the president of the Assembly did not allow the referendum. He said that it was an abuse of the referendum law. The law took effect on 24 May 2016 and it became operational on 24 February 2017 without changes in marriage (only civil partnership).

On  16 June 2022, the Constitutional Court of Slovenia voted in a court decision that the statutory definition of marriage as a living community of a husband and a wife is unconstitutional, thus legalising same-sex marriage. The court decision was published on 8 July 2022 and came into force a day later, on 9 July. The National Assembly passed the act implementing the decision on 4 October 2022 in a 48–29 vote. On 11 October, the act was vetoed by the National Council, but it was reconfirmed by the National Assembly in a 51–24 vote on 18 October.

A new law legalizing same-sex marriage and allowing same-sex couples to jointly adopt children in Slovenia, came into effect on January 31, 2023. The ability to enter into registered same-sex partnerships has been closed off since the new same-sex marriage law took effect.

Discrimination protections
Since 1998 discrimination on basis of sexual orientation in workplaces has been banned. The same goes for employment seekers. Discrimination on the basis of sexual orientation is also banned in a variety of other fields, including education, housing and the provision of goods and services. The anti-discrimination laws however, are vague and open to interpretation and thus, very rarely enforced. In July 2009, the Constitutional Court held that Article 14(1) of the Slovenian Constitution bans discrimination based on sexual orientation.

On 17 February 2016, the government introduced new anti-discrimination bill, which prohibits discrimination based on sexual orientation, gender identity and gender expression, among others. It was approved by the National Assembly on 21 April, in a 50–17 vote. The National Council did not require the Assembly to vote on the bill again. On 28 April, the union of migrant workers SDMS filed a motion, with required 2,500 signatures, in order to be allowed to proceed with the petition for referendum. However, on 5 May, the Speaker of the National Assembly Milan Brglez refused to set a 35-day deadline during which the proposers could collect 40,000 valid signatures to force the referendum, arguing that this and several other SDMS referendum initiatives constitutes an abuse of the referendum laws. He sent the bill for promulgation the next day. It was promulgated by President Borut Pahor and published in the official journal on 9 May 2016. On 10 May, SDMS challenged the Brglez's decision to the Constitutional Court. In July 2016, the Constitutional Court rejected the challenge.

Public opinion 
A Eurobarometer survey published in December 2006 showed that 31% of Slovenians surveyed support same-sex marriage and 17% think homosexuals should be allowed to adopt children (EU-wide average 44% and 33%).

A poll conducted by Delo Stik in February 2015 showed that 59% of Slovenians surveyed supported same-sex marriage, while 38% supported adoptions by same-sex couples. The poll also gauged support for the same-sex marriage bill, which was debated in the National Assembly at the time. The results showed that a narrow majority (51%) of Slovenians surveyed supported the bill.

LGBT movement in Slovenia 

The lesbian and gay movement has been active in Ljubljana since 1984, when MAGNUS, the gay section at ŠKUC (Student Cultural and Art Centre, Ljubljana), was founded as the "Cultural Organisation for Socialisation of Homosexuality." A pro-lesbian feminist group, Lilit, was started in 1985, followed in 1987 by LL, a lesbian group within ŠKUC. In 1990 Magnus and LL founded the national lesbian and gay campaigning organisation, Roza Klub.

Other parts of the country have no or very few organizations regarding sexual orientation.

Social conditions

Gay culture 
In Ljubljana there are many gay-friendly clubs and bars. Having started with only a few, the number increases every year. At klub K4 in Ljubljana there are gay and lesbian parties (K4 ROZA) one Saturday a month. At clubs Factory and Bolivar there are gay and lesbian parties organized by Jing Jang group. Parties take place there usually once a month. Other gay-friendly bars and clubs in Ljubljana are Lan, Tiffany and Galerija.

Anti-LGBT violence 
There have been numerous instances of violent gay-bashing all over Slovenia, including an attack that occurred in June of 2009 during a literary event at one of the famous gay bars in Ljubljana, Open. Gay rights activist and radio journalist Mitja Blažič was hospitalized following the attack by eight black-masked younger males with torches.

In 2007, in Maribor, several individuals were beaten up by younger males during a Pride parade.

In March 2019, a brick was thrown through the window of Društvo DIH – Enakopravni pod mavrico, an LGBT NGO. 

In 2019, a gay man was beaten by several individuals in Murska Sobota. He suffered kidney injuries and several broken ribs. 

On 1 November 2019, a group of individuals vandalized an LGBT club, Tiffany, in the early morning hours at Metelkova in Ljubljana, and threatened the staff with violence.

Summary table

See also

LGBT rights in Europe
 LGBT rights in the European Union

References